501 Queen (301 Queen during overnight periods) is an east–west Toronto streetcar route in Ontario, Canada, operated by the Toronto Transit Commission (TTC). It stretches from Long Branch Loop (just west of Browns Line, adjacent to Long Branch GO Station) in the west to Neville Park Loop (just west of Victoria Park Avenue) in the east, running on Lake Shore Boulevard, in a reserved right-of-way within the median of the Queensway, and on Queen Street. This route operates as part of the TTC's Blue Night Network service, operating from approximately 1 am to 5 am as the 301 Queen.

With 8 million annual boardings in 2021, 501 Queen is the second busiest streetcar line in Toronto, after 504 King.

History
In 1875, the Kingston Road Tramway operated a horsecar service along what would become today's Queen Street East. This line was abandoned in the mid 1880s, at about which time the Toronto Street Railway extended its King horsecar line onto Queen Street East to Lee Avenue in The Beaches district. In 1893, the Toronto Railway Company electrified the line. In 1921, the TTC took over streetcar service.

From 1923 to 1928, the Beach streetcar line ran along Queen Street from Neville Park Boulevard to the Humber River similar to today's 501 Queen. At about this time, there was also a route named "Queen", but it ran along Kingston Road to McCaul and Queen streets much like today's 502 Downtowner.

From 1928 to 1937, service to the eastern and western ends of Queen Street was handled by separate routes. Thus, one would need to transfer streetcars in the downtown area to travel the full length of Queen Street.

On August 2, 1937, a new Queen route served all of Queen Street between Neville Park Loop and Parkside Loop. (The Parkside Loop was located at the northeast corner of Lakeshore Boulevard and Parkside Drive, south of the rail corridor, which was crossed by a bridge.) East of Roncesvalles Avenue, the Queen route resembled today's 501 Queen.

On September 14, 1940, the PCC streetcar was introduced on the Queen route on Sundays, displacing Peter Witt streetcars.  PCCs were placed in Queen night service on October 3, 1940, and in regular daily service on May 1, 1941.

By 1954, when the Yonge subway (today part of Line 1 Yonge–University) opened, an underground streetcar station was partially built at Queen station to eventually allow streetcars to cross under the subway tracks. The plan was to put the Queen streetcar line in a tunnel under Queen Street between Logan Avenue and Trinity Park. However, because of changing ridership patterns, the plan was dropped in favour of east-west subway line along Bloor Street and Danforth Avenue (today's Line 2 Bloor–Danforth). Today, Lower Queen remains a ghost station.

In 1957, to accommodate construction of the Gardiner Expressway, the streetcar tracks were removed from Lake Shore Boulevard between Roncesvalles Avenue and the Humber River, and the bridge crossing the rail corridor was demolished. As a replacement, a new private right-of-way was built along the Queensway from the Sunnyside Loop to the Humber Loop. At the Humber Loop, passengers could transfer to the Long Branch streetcar which shuttled between the Humber and Long Branch loops.

Between 1967 and early 1977, two-car multiple-unit PCC trains served the Queen streetcar route.

On March 26, 1995, the 507 Long Branch route was replaced by a westward extension of the 501 Queen route. At this point, 501 Queen was at its maximum and present-day length.

In 2013, the TTC considered setting up a transit mall on the downtown portion of either Queen or King Street. TTC CEO Andy Byford wanted a car-free corridor along one of the city's two busiest streetcar lines (either 501 Queen or 504 King) to prevent bunching, gaps and service delays. Byford would ban general automobile traffic along the streetcar corridor but allow cyclists, taxicabs and delivery trucks. Byford preferred King Street for the transit mall because of recent condominium development along that street. There were similar proposals for a transit mall in 2001 and 2007. Ultimately, the King Street Transit Priority Corridor was established in late 2017.

In January 2017, construction began for approximately 15 months on various projects west of Roncesvalles Avenue, including rebuilding the bridge over the Humber River carrying streetcar tracks. Other work included replacing track and overhead along portions of the Queensway and Lake Shore Boulevard as well as at the Humber Loop. Also at the Humber Loop, a new substation was built, platforms were made accessible to accommodate Flexity streetcars and a siding on the west-to-east loop was modified. In April 2018, streetcar operations resumed between Sunnyside Loop and Humber Loop. Streetcar service between Humber Loop and Long Branch Loop resumed in June 2018.

From May to September 2017, all streetcar service along the entire 501 Queen route was replaced by buses to permit multiple construction projects along Queen Street to take place, including the replacement of an overhead pedestrian walkway at the Eaton Centre, which required overhead wires to be removed. According to a TTC spokesperson, it took 65 buses to replace the 50 streetcars then operating east of the Sunnyside Loop.

Since March 31, 2021, the 501 Queen route has been partially closed due to construction activity, including track replacement and the extension of the exclusive streetcar right-of-way on the Queensway west of Roncesvalles Avenue. Also, the TTC was upgrading the streetcar overhead for pantographs. The result was that streetcar service was temporarily replaced by buses from Parliament Street to Long Branch Loop, with a diversion along King and Bathurst Streets to Wolseley Loop. Streetcar service was restored along Queen Street between Parliament and Bathurst Streets on February 13, 2022, to Dufferin Street on September 4, 2022, and to Roncesvalles Avenue (Sunnyside Loop) on January 25, 2023.

Rolling stock

Route 501 Queen was once served mainly by Articulated Light Rail Vehicles (ALRVs) and occasionally supplemented with some of the shorter Canadian Light Rail Vehicles (CLRVs). However, by 2018, the route was mainly served by CLRVs. This was due to the declining reliability and accelerated retirement of the ALRV fleet.

Flexity Outlook streetcars were introduced on the 501 Queen route in phases; weekend service using the Flexity vehicles along the route began in September 2018 and moved to full-time on January 6, 2019. The TTC had to address rush-hour crowding due to the accelerated retirement of the ALRV fleet, the last of which made their final voyages on September 2, 2019.

By June 23, 2019, the main portion of the route (along Queen Street and the Queensway between Humber Loop and Neville Park Loop) was the first to be fully served by Flexity Outlook streetcars; the southwest portion of the route (along Lake Shore Boulevard between Humber and Long Branch Loop) followed suit on September 1, 2019.

507 Long Branch

Route 507 Long Branch was a streetcar route that ran along Lake Shore Boulevard West between Humber Loop and Long Branch Loop. Since 1995, the line has been served by the extended 501 Queen route.

Until September 27, 1928, service along Lake Shore Boulevard west of Humber Loop was provided by the single-track Mimico radial line which continued west to Port Credit. Starting from that date, the TTC replaced the radial track to Long Branch with a double-track streetcar line. On December 8, 1928, the Lake Shore streetcar service (not the same as the later 508 Lake Shore) began operation from downtown Toronto to Long Branch Loop where, until 1937, passengers could transfer to the shortened Port Credit radial line. An extra fare was required to travel from west of Humber Loop to downtown.

On October 28, 1935, the Lake Shore streetcar route was split, and the new Long Branch route was created to run between Long Branch Loop and Roncesvalles Carhouse. In 1958, when a new reserved streetcar right-of-way was opened on the Queensway, the Long Branch route (later called 507 Long Branch) was cut back operating mainly west of Humber Loop.

On January 1, 1973, passengers could transfer between the Long Branch and Queen streetcars at Humber Loop without paying an extra fare.

On September 30, 1979, Long Branch (by now 507 Long Branch) became the first route to employ the then-new CLRV in revenue service. On January 19, 1988, 507 Long Branch was also the first route to employ the ALRV in revenue service.

On March 26, 1995, the TTC merged the 507 Long Branch route into 501 Queen, making one continuous route from Neville Park Loop in the east to Long Branch Loop.

Route splitting

2009 split
By 2007, critics of the TTC's management of this line argue that small delays at one end ripple into 30-40 minute waits at the other. Like route 504, there is much demand at either end of the route, and along the downtown middle stretch. Transit proponents such as Steve Munro have long claimed that Route 501 would be better off if it were split into two or three overlapping segments.

In late 2009, the TTC conducted an experiment of splitting the 501 streetcar route into two overlapping segments, as recommended by critics to alleviate bunching, gaps and short turns when delays occurred. During the experiment streetcars from the Neville Park Loop ran west on Queen Street as far as Shaw Street, and from Long Branch Loop or Humber Loop east as far as Parliament Street.

In January 2010, the commission received a report analyzing several of the experiments done in 2009 to increase service reliability. It was determined that splitting the route increased short turns by 90%, required more streetcars and resulted in poorer service. The TTC decided to use a route-management system called Step Forward, whereby when an operator goes off duty (break or end of shift), another operator takes over the streetcar instead of the streetcar going out of service along with off-duty operator. According to the TTC, Step Forward reduced short turns in late 2007, from 32.5% to 9.7% in the PM rush hours, and from 13.9% to 4.1% in the AM rush. It also was successful in reducing service gaps according to the TTC. Implementing Step Forward required eight extra operators and two extra supervisors.

2016 split
By 2015, passengers were complaining about service on the 501 streetcar. Streetcars would often arrive at irregular intervals, causing unscheduled waits of 20–30 minutes. Streetcars would also do unscheduled short turns at Kingston Road or Roncesvalles Avenue, forcing passengers to exit and wait for the next streetcar. To address these problems and make service more predictable for riders, the TTC again split the 501 Queen route.

On January 3, 2016, the route was split into two sections at Humber Loop. The split was in effect only from 5am to 10pm. During the split, service over the entire route operated at intervals of ten minutes or better. The change was also made to provide more frequent service on each segment and to eliminate all but emergency short turns (such as for an accident) on the segment east of Humber Loop. Transfer-free service through Humber Loop was still provided by 3 runs in the morning, in the late evening and overnight. Some riders reported shorter streetcar wait times after the split.

The split was suspended starting from January 8, 2017, due to construction projects affecting Humber Loop. When streetcar service west of Humber Loop resumed on June 24, 2018, the split was reinstated. Initially, the TTC provided five transfer-free trips during the morning peak period; however, effective September 2, 2018, the TTC temporarily suspended these five runs due to a shortage of streetcars.

From June 21, 2020, most 501 Queen streetcars operated the full route between Neville Park and Long Branch loops. This ended the split in 501 Queen service at Humber Loop where passengers from Long Branch had to change streetcars to continue downtown.

Route
From Neville Park Loop, the route proceeds westward in mixed traffic on Queen Street East. At Kingston Road, passengers can transfer to the 502 Downtowner and 503 Kingston Rd streetcars. Further west, Broadview Avenue provides a transfer point to the 504 King streetcars to go along King Street. At Yonge Street, the route passes Queen station on subway Line 1 Yonge–University.

After crossing Yonge Street, the route continues on Queen Street West. At University Avenue, the route passes Osgoode station again on Line 1 Yonge–University. At Spadina Avenue, riders can transfer to 510 Spadina streetcars, and at Bathurst Street, to 511 Bathurst streetcars. The route continues to the western end of Queen Street West at the intersection of King Street West and Roncesvalles Avenue where riders can again transfer to 504 King streetcars.

Beyond Roncesvalles Avenue, Queen Street West flows onto the Queensway, where 501 Queen streetcars run in their own right-of-way until reaching the off-street Humber Loop. Leaving Humber Loop, the line passes through a short streetcar tunnel under a railway corridor and the Gardiner Expressway. The line emerges from the tunnel onto Lake Shore Boulevard West and proceeds westward in mixed traffic to Long Branch Loop where the route terminates.

Sites along the line
From east to west:
 The Beaches
 Moss Park and Moss Park Armoury
 Toronto Eaton Centre
 Old City Hall
 Toronto City Hall and Nathan Phillips Square
 Osgoode Hall
 Four Seasons Centre
 299 Queen Street West (Home to MuchMusic, CP24, Bell Media)
 Trinity Bellwoods Park
 Centre for Addiction and Mental Health
 Drake Hotel
 Gladstone Hotel
 Parkdale
 High Park
 Humber Bay Park
 Colonel Samuel Smith Park
 Humber College, Lakeshore Campus

In popular culture

Toronto's Brickworks Ciderhouse produces a semi-sweet cider called the "Queen Street 501" which is an homage to the streetcar route, as well as Queen Street in general.

See also
  used by 501 Queen

References

External links

TTC Official Site
TTC route page for 501 Queen
TTC route page for 301 Queen
Route 501 - The Queen Streetcar (Transit Toronto)
Photo tour of 501 Queen (Transit Toronto)

Streetcar routes in Toronto
4 ft 10⅞ in gauge railways